John Dooley was an American football coach. He was the tenth head football coach at Eureka College in Eureka, Illinois, serving for two seasons, from 1967 to 1968, and compiling a record of 3–12–1.

Head coaching record

References

Possibly living people
Year of birth missing
Eureka Red Devils football coaches